The Paterna International Piano Prize (Valencian: Premi Internacional Pianístic de Paterna, Spanish: Premio Internacional Pianístico de Paterna) is a biennial piano competition in Paterna, Valencia, Spain. It first took place April 24–29, 2011 and was won by Yedam Kim of South Korea.

Winners

Results

Jurors

2011
 Ludmil Angelov
 José María Cervera
 Leonel Morales

 Pierre Reach
 Marian Rybicki

 Pablo Sánchez Torrella
 Emin Guven Yaslicam

External links
 official website

References

Piano competitions
Music competitions in Spain
Paterna